The zygomaticus minor muscle is a muscle of facial expression. It originates from the zygomatic bone, lateral to the rest of the levator labii superioris muscle, and inserts into the outer part of the upper lip. It draws the upper lip backward, upward, and outward and is used in smiling. It is innervated by the facial nerve (VII).

Structure 
The zygomaticus minor muscle originates from the zygomatic bone. It inserts into the tissue around the upper lip, particularly blending its fibres with orbicularis oris muscle. It lies lateral to the rest of  levator labii superioris muscle, and medial to its stronger synergist zygomaticus major muscle. It travels at an angle of approximately 30°. It has a mean width of around 0.5 cm.

Nerve supply 
The zygomaticus minor muscle is supplied by the buccal branch of the facial nerve (VII).

Variation 
The zygomaticus minor muscle may have either a straight or a curved course along its length. It may attach to both the upper lip and the lateral alar region. It may be underdeveloped in some people, with its role taken over by nearby synergists. These synergists rarely change shape or position, but any difference in smile is usually imperceptible.

Function 
The zygomaticus minor muscle draws the upper lip up, back, and out, such as during smiling.

History 
The zygomaticus minor muscle is sometimes referred to as the "zygomatic head" of the levator labii superioris muscle.

Images

See also 
 Zygomaticus major muscle
 Zygomatic bone

References

External links 
 PTCentral

Muscles of the head and neck